The Custer County Courthouse in Broken Bow, Nebraska was listed on the National Register of Historic Places as Custer County  and Jail in 1979.  It was built in 1911.

It was designed by Liechtenstein-born architect John Latenser in Classical Revival style.

References

External links

Courthouses in Nebraska
Jails in Nebraska
National Register of Historic Places in Custer County, Nebraska
Neoclassical architecture in Nebraska
Government buildings completed in 1911